The 64th Academy Awards ceremony, presented by the Academy of Motion Picture Arts and Sciences (AMPAS), honored the best films of 1991 in the United States and took place on March 30, 1992, at the Dorothy Chandler Pavilion in Los Angeles beginning at 6:00 p.m. PST / 9:00 p.m. EST. During the ceremony, the Academy of Motion Picture Arts and Sciences presented Academy Awards (commonly referred to as Oscars) in 23 categories. The ceremony, televised in the United States by ABC, was produced by Gil Cates and directed by Jeff Margolis. Actor Billy Crystal hosted the show for the third consecutive year. Three weeks earlier, in a ceremony held at the Century Plaza Hotel in Los Angeles on March 7, the Academy Awards for Technical Achievement were presented by host Tom Hanks.

The Silence of the Lambs won five awards, including Best Picture. Other winners included Terminator 2: Judgment Day with four awards, Beauty and the Beast, Bugsy, and JFK with two, and City Slickers, Deadly Deception: General Electric, Nuclear Weapons and Our Environment, The Fisher King, In the Shadow of the Stars, Manipulation, Mediterraneo, Session Man, and Thelma & Louise with one. The telecast garnered more than 44 million viewers in the United States.

Winners and nominees 

The nominees for the 64th Academy Awards were announced on February 19, 1992, at 5:38 a.m. PST (13:38 UTC) at the Samuel Goldwyn Theater in Beverly Hills, California, by Karl Malden, president of the Academy, and the actress Kathleen Turner. Bugsy led all nominees with ten nominations; JFK came in second with eight.

The winners were announced during the awards ceremony on March 30, 1992. The Silence of the Lambs became the first horror film to win Best Picture and the first film to be released on home video prior to winning that award. Moreover, it was the third film to win the "Big Five" major categories for picture, directing, lead acting performances, and screenwriting. The other two films to achieve this feat were 1934's It Happened One Night and 1975's One Flew Over the Cuckoo's Nest. Beauty and the Beast became the first animated film to be nominated for Best Picture. Toy Story 3 and Up are the only two other animated films ever nominated for Best Picture. By virtue of her second win for Best Actress, Jodie Foster, at age 28 became the youngest person to win two Oscars. Boyz n the Hoods John Singleton became the first African-American to be nominated for Best Director and the youngest nominee in that category. Nominated for Best Supporting Actress and Best Actress, respectively, Diane Ladd and Laura Dern became the first mother and daughter nominated in the same year.

 Awards 

Winners are listed first, highlighted in boldface''' and indicated with double dagger.

 Academy Honorary Award 
 Satyajit Ray

 Irving G. Thalberg Memorial Award 
 George Lucas

 Films with multiple nominations and awards 

The following 16 films had multiple nominations:

The following five films received multiple awards:

 Presenters and performers 
The following individuals presented awards or performed musical numbers:

 Presenters (in order of appearance) 

 Performers (in order of appearance) 

 Ceremony information 

Riding on the success of 63rd Academy Awards which won several Emmys, AMPAS rehired Gil Cates for the third consecutive year. He christened the 1992 ceremony with the theme "Pure Joy of the Movies" explaining that "Motion pictures provide us with laughter, romance, adventure and a deeper understanding of ourselves. With all the extraordinary events that are taking place today, it's wonderful that we can still get away to see a film."

A month before the festivities, Cates recruited actor and comedian Billy Crystal to host the ceremony for the third straight year. According to Variety columnist Army Archerd, Crystal planned to perform a bungee jump stunt as part of his entrance at the beginning of the ceremony. However, the act was scrapped due to high insurance costs for the Academy and Crystal coming down with the flu. Instead, Crystal, who was wearing Hannibal Lecter's mask from The Silence of the Lambs, was hauled onto the stage by two men.

Several other people were involved in the production of the ceremony. Choreographer Debbie Allen supervised the Best Song nominee performances and the Best Original Score dance number. Film composer and musician Bill Conti served as musical director of the ceremony. In tandem with the theme of the ceremony, Chuck Workman produced a montage highlighting famous movie scenes from past and present.

 Box office performance of nominees 
At the time of the nominations announcement on February 19, the combined gross of the five Best Picture nominees at the US box office was $393 million with an average of $78.7 million per film. The Silence of the Lambs was the highest earner among the Best Picture nominees with $130.7 million in domestic box office receipts. The film was followed by Beauty and the Beast ($106.6 million), The Prince of Tides ($59.3 million), JFK ($58.1 million), and finally Bugsy ($38.9 million).

Of the 50 top-grossing movies of the year, 72 nominations went to 15 of them. Only Silence of the Lambs (3rd), Beauty and the Beast (6th), Cape Fear (10th), The Prince of Tides (18th), JFK (21st), Boyz n the Hood (22nd), Thelma and Louise (27th), The Fisher King (30th), and Bugsy (32nd) were nominated for Best Picture, directing, acting, or screenwriting. The other top 50 box office hits that earned nominations were Terminator 2: Judgment Day (1st), Robin Hood: Prince of Thieves (2nd), Hook (5th), The Addams Family (7th), Backdraft (12th), and Star Trek VI: the Undiscovery Country (13th).

 LGBT in film protest 
Several days before the ceremony, LGBT activist groups such as Queer Nation and Out in Film announced plans to stage a protest outside the Dorothy Chandler Pavilion. The organizations were voicing their complaints regarding derogatory and unflattering portrayals of homosexuals in film such as The Silence of the Lambs, JFK, and the upcoming film Basic Instinct. Queer Nation spokesman Rick Wilson said that the demonstrators "would stop cars from getting to the Oscars. It'll be a stall-in". Wilson also announced plans to disrupt the proceedings inside the theater. In response, producer Gil Cates stated, "Anyone can protest about anything they want outside the show." But he said that the standard, "generic response" to something happening during the ceremony on camera, "would be to cut to a commercial." Moreover, Academy spokesman Bob Werden reiterated that while security plans would not be as stringent as the previous year, firemen and police officers would be on hand in case of fallout from the protests.

On the day of the telecast, several protesters carried various signs that contained statements such as "Stop Hollywood's Homophobia" and "Hollywood Stop Censoring Our True Queer Lives." One man who had purchased tickets to the ceremony yelled statistics regarding AIDS in protest as John Candy was introducing a Best Song performance. The protester was immediately escorted out by security without any arrests, nor were his remarks heard during the broadcast.

 Critical reviews 
The show received a positive reception from most media publications. The New York Times film critic Janet Maslin raved that the telecast was "uncharacteristically lively". She also praised host Crystal saying that his opening monologue "set the evening's clever and iconoclastic tone." Columnist Scott Williams of the Associated Press wrote that "Crystal was charming from the moment he was wheeled onstage and strolled into the audience wearing the face mask of the demonic Hannibal 'The Cannibal' Lecter from The Silence of the Lambs, which was named best picture." Ray Richmond from the Orange County Register'' commented that Crystal "is such a magnificent Oscar host that the job should be his as long as he wants it."

Ratings and reception 
The American telecast on ABC drew in an average of 44.44 million people over its length, which was a 5% increase from the previous year's ceremony. The show also drew higher Nielsen ratings compared to the previous ceremony with 29.84% of households watching over a 50.26 share. In addition, it also drew a higher 18–49 demo rating with a 20.71 rating over a 39.51 share among viewers in that demographic.

In July 1992, the ceremony presentation received nine nominations at the 44th Primetime Emmys. The following month, the ceremony won three of those nominations for Outstanding Writing for a Variety Program (Hal Kanter, Buz Kohan, Billy Crystal, Marc Shaiman, David Steinberg, Robert Wuhl, Bruce Vilanch), Outstanding Music Direction (Bill Conti, Jack Eskew, Julie Giroux, Ashley Irwin, Hummie Mann), and Outstanding Costume Design for a Variety or Music Program (Raymond Aghayan).

See also 

 12th Golden Raspberry Awards
 34th Grammy Awards
 44th Primetime Emmy Awards
 45th British Academy Film Awards
 46th Tony Awards
 49th Golden Globe Awards
 List of submissions to the 64th Academy Awards for Best Foreign Language Film
 1991 in film

References

Bibliography

External links 
Official websites
 Academy Awards Official website
 The Academy of Motion Picture Arts and Sciences Official website

Analysis
 1991 Academy Awards Winners and History Filmsite
 Academy Awards, USA: 1992 Internet Movie Database

Other resources
 

1991 film awards
1992 in the United States
Academy Awards ceremonies
1992 in Los Angeles
1992 in American cinema
March 1992 events in the United States
Academy
Television shows directed by Jeff Margolis